A National Policy Statement is created by governments to establish a consistent policy on an issue across a nation. 

National Policy Statement (New Zealand)
National Policy Statement (United Kingdom)